Do Not Open: An encyclopedia of the world's best-kept secrets is a book published on October 25, 2007, by Dorling Kindersley and written by John Farndon. Its cover artist was Sophia M Tampakopoulos Turner and was illustrated by Mr Bingo, Khuan Caveman Co., Gilman Calsen, Sheila Collins, Craig Conlan, Alain Goffan, Gennie Haworth, Headcase Design, Irene Jacobs, Neal Murren, Lead Pants, and Ali Pellatt. It was preceded by Pick Me Up and was followed by Take Me Back.

Reviews
Reviews in Publishers Weekly, Library Journal, Booklist, Kirkus and Wall Street Journal.

English-language encyclopedias
Trivia books
DK (publisher) books